The Tefenni nase or Tefenni minnow (Chondrostoma fahirae) is a species of ray-finned fish in the family Cyprinidae.
It is found only in Turkey where it has a distribution limited to the Kirkpinar spring in Karamusa village near Tefenni, Karatash Lake and Değirmendere stream flowing into Karamanlı Reservoir in wider Lake Burdur basin in Central Anatolia. Its natural habitats are rivers and intermittent rivers.
It is threatened by habitat loss and was extirpated from the Kirkinpar spring, its type locality, and had to be reintroduced there with unknown success, the population in Değirmendere was discovered in the 21st Century and its size is unknown.

References

 

	
	

Chondrostoma
Fish of Turkey
Fish described in 1960
Endemic fauna of Turkey
Taxonomy articles created by Polbot